The 1962 Winter Universiade, the II Winter Universiade, took place in Villars, Switzerland.

Medal table

Alpine skiing
Men: Slalom 
Gold – Willy Bogner (West Germany) 
Gold – Ulf Ekstam (Finland) 
Bronze – Masayoshi Mitani (Japan)

Men: Downhill 
Gold – Philippe Mollard (France) 
Silver – Walter Kutschera (Austria) 
Bronze – Willy Bogner (West Germany)

Men: Combined 
Combined event is the overall standings of all disciplines on the Universiade program. 
Gold – Willy Bogner (West Germany) 
Silver – Philippe Mollard (France) 
Bronze – Manfred Köstinger (Austria)

Women: Slalom 
Gold – Cécile Prince (France) 
Silver – Barbi Henneberger (West Germany) 
Bronze – Annie Famose (France)

Women: Giant Slalom 
Gold – Barbi Henneberger (West Germany) 
Silver – Astrid Sandvik (Norway) 
Bronze – Annie Famose (France) 
Bronze – Gertraud Ehrenfried (Austria)

Women: Downhill 
Gold – Barbi Henneberger (West Germany) 
Silver – Gertraud Ehrenfried (Austria) 
Bronze – Cécile Prince (France)

Women: Combined 
Combined event is the overall standings of all disciplines on the Universiade program. 
Gold – Barbi Henneberger (West Germany) 
Silver – Cécile Prince (France) 
Bronze – Gundl Sernetz (Austria)

Nordic skiing
Men: 12 km Classical 
Gold – Igor Veranzhinin (Soviet Union) 
Silver – German Karpov (Soviet Union) 
Bronze – Ivan Kondrachev (Soviet Union)

Nordic combined
Small Hill Ski Jumping and 15km Cross-Country

Men: 
Gold – Vyacheslav Dryagin (Soviet Union) 
Silver – Albert Larinov (Soviet Union) 
Bronze – Yosuke Eto (Japan)

Ski jumpingMen: Small Hill - K90 
Gold – Shigeyuki Wasaka (Japan) 
Silver – Yosuke Eto (Japan) 
Bronze – Renzo Nigawara (Japan)

Ice hockeyMen:Gold – Czechoslovakia 
Silver – Soviet Union 
Bronze – Sweden

Figure skatingWomen:''' 
Gold – Junko Ueno (Japan) 
Silver – Jitka Hlavacková (Czechoslovakia) 
Bronze – Helga Zollner (Hungary)

References
 World List of Future International Meetings - Part 2 - Page 79, Reference Department, Library of Congress., 1961

1962
U
U
U
Multi-sport events in Switzerland
Sport in the canton of Vaud
March 1962 sports events in Europe
Winter sports competitions in Switzerland